Jason Hale (born June 15, 1969) is a Canadian former politician who was an elected member to the Legislative Assembly of Alberta representing the electoral district of Strathmore-Brooks.

He was elected in the 2012 provincial election as a member of the Wildrose Party.

In December 2012 Hale crossed the floor to join Jim Prentice's Progressive Conservative Party. One month after Derek Fildebrandt announced that he would seak the Wildrose nomination in Strathmore-Brooks, Hale announced that he would not seek re-election.

As the local MLA, Hale took the lead for the Wildrose Official Opposition when the XL Foods plant in Brooks was shut down due to contamination. Hale welcomed the takeover of the plant by JBS and called for a full investigation into the causes of the contamination.

Hale was born and raised near Bassano, Alberta. Hale, along with his wife and two sons, run a cow/calf operation. He also worked as a consultant in the oil and gas industry before becoming an MLA. 
 
Hale graduated from SAIT with a diploma in chemical technology. Hale was also a professional bull fighter for 10 years, a member of the Bassano Rodeo committee for the past eight years, and a director on the Bassano Ag Society for three years. He has regularly volunteered as a coach for hockey and baseball.

In May 2013, Hale and MLA Kerry Towle held a press conference along with residents of Brooks to criticize conditions at AgeCare facilities in Brooks and alleged seniors abuse had occurred. The pressure from Hale, Towle, Brooks residents and the Wildrose Party caused the Minister of Health Fred Horne to order an investigation into the alleged mistreatment.

Electoral history

References

Wildrose Party MLAs
Living people
1969 births
Progressive Conservative Association of Alberta MLAs
Southern Alberta Institute of Technology alumni
21st-century Canadian politicians